Floyd Eldon Davis (March 5, 1909 – May 31, 1977) was the co-winner of the 1941 Indianapolis 500.

Floyd Davis drove the first 72 laps of the 1941 race before being replaced by Mauri Rose, who completed the race in the lead.

He is buried at Crown Hill Cemetery in Indianapolis (Section 53 Lot 320).

In the 1941 Indianapolis 500, Floyd Davis had been driving the Noc-Out Hose Clamp car for sixty laps, moving from 17th to 12th place when teammate Mauri Rose, the pole sitter, began experiencing problems with his car, the Elgin Piston Pin. The films show that he wasn't too happy when at lap 72, team owner Lou Moore pulled Davis from his car and replaced him with Rose.  “I was ready to go into the lead when they called me in,” he later joked.

That is exactly though what Rose did do, winning the first of his three 500 championships, and earning Davis an asterisk in the history books as a co-winner, despite the fact that he never led a single lap in any of his races.  And though Davis received a 50-50 split of the prize money, he never drove in another 500, some say because of his disgust in having been relieved.  His serving in the U.S. Navy during World War II might also have had something to do with his leaving racing.

He had driven in three previous 500s, coming in 15th in 1937, 27th in 1939, and 20th in 1940.

Complete AAA Championship Car results

Indianapolis 500 results

References

1909 births
1977 deaths
Indianapolis 500 drivers
Indianapolis 500 winners
People from Menard County, Illinois
Racing drivers from Illinois
AAA Championship Car drivers
Burials at Crown Hill Cemetery
United States Navy personnel of World War II